The 2021 Walsall Metropolitan Borough Council election took place on 6 May 2021 to elect members of Walsall Council in England. This was on the same day as the 2021 elections for the West Midlands Police and Crime Commissioner, and the 2021 West Midlands mayoral election. These elections had been delayed from May 2020 due to the COVID-19 pandemic in the United Kingdom.

One-third of the seats were up for election, with one ward (Pelsall) electing three councillors.

Results

Ward results

Aldridge Central and South

Aldridge North and Walsall Wood

Bentley and Darlaston North

Birchills-Leamore

Blakenall

Bloxwich East

Bloxwich West

Brownhills

Darlaston South

Paddock

Palfrey

Pelsall 
Three seats available.

Pheasey Park Farm

Pleck

Rushall-Shelfield

Short Heath

Streetly

St Matthews

Willenhall North

Willenhall South

By-elections

Pleck

References 

Walsall
Walsall Council elections